Ziff Davis, Inc. is an American digital media and internet company. First founded in 1927 by William Bernard Ziff Sr. and Bernard George Davis, the company primarily owns technology- and health-oriented media websites, online shopping-related services, internet connectivity services, gaming and entertainment brands, and cybersecurity and martech tools.

History
The company was founded by William B. Ziff Company publisher Bill Ziff Sr. with Bernard Davis. Upon Bill Ziff's death in 1953, William B. Ziff Jr., his son,  returned from Germany to lead the company.  In 1958, Bernard Davis sold Ziff Jr. his share of Ziff Davis to found Davis Publications, Inc.; Ziff Davis continued to use the Davis surname as Ziff-Davis.

Throughout most of Ziff Davis' history, it was a publisher of hobbyist magazines, often ones devoted to expensive, advertiser-rich technical hobbies such as cars, photography, and electronics. Since 1980, Ziff Davis has primarily published computer-related magazines and related websites, establishing Ziff Davis as an Internet information company.

Ziff Davis had several broadcasting properties, first during the mid-1970s, and later with its own technology network ZDTV, later renamed to TechTV, that was sold to Vulcan Ventures in 2001. Ziff Davis' magazine publishing and Internet operations offices are based in New York City, Massachusetts, and San Francisco.

On January 6, 2009, the company sold 1UP.com to Hearst's UGO Entertainment, a division of and announced the January 2009 issue of the long-running Electronic Gaming Monthly magazine would be its last.

Former Time Inc. executive Vivek R. Shah, with financial backing from Boston private equity company Great Hill Partners, announced on June 4, 2010, the acquisition of Ziff Davis Inc. as the "first step in building a new digital media company that specializes in producing and distributing content for consumers making important buying decisions."

On November 12, 2012, Ziff Davis Inc., was acquired by cloud computing services company J2 Global for $167 million cash. According to an October 2015 Fortune article, Ziff Davis comprises 30% of parent company J2 Global's $600 million annual revenue (2014) and is increasing 15% to 20% each year. Analyst Gregory Burns of Sidoti & Company calculates that Ziff Davis is worth $1.9 billion.

In April 2021, J2 Global announced that it would spin off its cloud services business as Consensus; the transaction was approved by its shareholders in September 2021, with J2 Global consisting primarily of its media business and VPN services, and subsequently taking on the Ziff Davis, Inc. name and "ZD" ticker symbol, essentially converting the Ziff Davis purchase into a reverse merger.

Popular Aviation

The William B. Ziff Company, founded in 1920, was a successful Chicago advertising agency that secured advertising from national companies such as Procter & Gamble for virtually all African American weekly newspapers. In 1923, Ziff acquired E. C. Auld Company, a Chicago publishing house. Ziff's first venture in magazine publishing was Ziff's Magazine, which featured short stories, one-act plays, humorous verse, and jokes. The title was changed to America's Humor in April 1926.

Bernard George Davis was the student editor of the University of Pittsburgh's humor magazine, the Pitt Panther, and was active in the Association of College Comics of the East. During his senior year he attended the association's convention and met William B. Ziff. When Davis graduated in 1927 he joined Ziff as the editor of America's Humor.

Ziff, who had been an aviator in World War I, created Popular Aviation in August 1927 that was published by Popular Aviation Publishing Company of Chicago, Illinois. Under editor Harley W. Mitchell it became the largest aviation magazine, with a circulation of 100,000 in 1929. The magazine's title became Aeronautics in June 1929 and the publishing company's name became Aeronautical Publications, Inc. The title was changed back to Popular Aviation in July 1930. The magazine became Flying in 1942 and is still published today by the Bonnier Corporation. The magazine celebrated its 90th anniversary in 2017.

The company histories normally give the founding date as 1927. This is when B.G. Davis joined and Popular Aviation magazine started. However, it was not until 1936 that the company became the "Ziff-Davis Publishing Company". (Popular Aviation, April 1936, was the first issue by Ziff-Davis Publishing.) Davis was given a substantial minority equity interest in the company and was appointed a vice-president and director. He was later named president in 1946. Davis was a photography enthusiast and the editor of the Popular Photography magazine started in May 1937.

Fiction, hobbyist and bridal magazines
In early 1938, Ziff-Davis acquired the magazines Radio News and Amazing Stories. These were started by Hugo Gernsback but sold as a result of the Experimenter Publishing bankruptcy in 1929. Both magazines had declined since the bankruptcy but the resources of Ziff-Davis rejuvenated them starting with the April 1938 issues. Radio News was published until 1972.  The magazine Popular Electronics, derived from Radio News, was begun in 1955 and published until 1985. Amazing Stories was a leading science fiction magazine and Ziff Davis soon added a new companion, Fantastic Adventures (FA). In 1954 FA was merged into the newer magazine Fantastic, founded in 1952 to great initial success. ZD published a number of other pulp magazines and, later, digest-sized fiction magazines during the 1940s and 1950s, and continued to publish Amazing and Fantastic until 1965.

Ziff-Davis published comic books during the early 1950s, operating by their own name and also the name Approved Comics. Eschewing superheroes, they published horror, crime, sports, romance, and Western comics, though most titles didn't last more than a few issues. Superman co-creator Jerry Siegel was the art director of the comics line; other notable creators who worked for Ziff-Davis Comics included John Buscema, Sid Greene, Bob Haney, Sam Kweskin, Rudy Lapick, Richard Lazarus, Mort Leav, Paul S. Newman, George Roussos, Mike Sekowsky, Ernie Schroeder, and Ogden Whitney. In 1953, the company mostly abandoned comics, selling its most popular titles—the romance comics Cinderella Love and Romantic Love, the Western Kid Cowboy, and the jungle adventure Wild Boy of the Congo—to St. John Publications. Ziff-Davis continued to publish one title, G.I. Joe, until 1957, a total of 51 issues.

From 1958, under the direction of sole owner Bill Ziff Jr., a polymath with a photographic memory, Ziff-Davis became a successful publisher of enthusiast magazines, purchasing titles like Car and Driver, and tailoring content for enthusiasts as well as purchasing agents ("brand specifiers"); the company was able to attract advertising money that other, general-interest publications were losing.

In 1958, Ziff-Davis began publishing a magazine, HiFi and Music Review, for the growing hobby of high fidelity equipment. Ultimately, the magazine evolved into Stereo Review. ZD also became a prolific publisher of photography and boating magazines during this period, and such magazines as Modern Bride; after the sale of Fantastic and Amazing in 1965, their editor Cele Goldsmith Lalli began working on the bridal magazines, becoming a notable and influential editor in that field before retirement.

During the 1970s and 1980s, the company's success increased with this strategy, and a rapidly expanding interest in electronics and computing. With titles such as PC Magazine, Popular Electronics, and Computer Shopper, Ziff Davis became the leading technology magazine business.

Ziff Davis sold the majority of its consumer magazines to CBS and its trade magazines to News Corporation in 1984, keeping its computer magazines.

Television stations
In 1979, Ziff Davis expanded into broadcasting, after an acquisition of television stations originally owned by greeting card company Rust Craft. Ziff Davis's stations included NBC affiliates WROC-TV in Rochester, New York and WRCB-TV in Chattanooga, Tennessee, CBS affiliates WEYI-TV in Saginaw, Michigan, WRDW-TV in Augusta, Georgia and WSTV-TV in Steubenville, Ohio (which changed its name to WTOV-TV and its network affiliation to NBC after Ziff Davis assumed control of the station), and ABC affiliate WJKS-TV in Jacksonville, Florida (which would also switch to NBC soon after its acquisition was finalized). These stations would be sold to other owners by the mid-1980s—most of these would become owned by a new ownership group, "Television Station Partners", the exceptions being WRCB (which would be sold to Sarkes Tarzian) and WJKS (which was acquired by Media General).

Technology magazines and web properties
Ziff Davis first started technology-themed publications during 1954, with Popular Electronics and, more briefly, Electronics World.  This resulted more or less directly in its interest in home-computer magazines. From that time, Ziff Davis became a major publisher of computer and Internet-related publishing. It acquired PC Magazine in 1982, and the trade journal MacWEEK in 1988. In 1989, the company initiated the ZDNet site. In 1991 ZDNet on CompuServe and on the early Internet were augmented by the purchase of Public Brand Software, the main shareware disk provider. In 1995 it initiated the magazine Yahoo! Internet Life, initially as ZD Internet Life. The magazine was meant to accompany and complement the site Yahoo!.

Owner William Bernard Ziff Jr. had wanted to give the business to his sons—Daniel, Dirk and Robert—but they didn't want the responsibility. In 1994, he announced the sale of the publishing group to Forstmann Little & Company for US$1.4 billion. It was then sold to SoftBank a year later.

In 1998, Ziff Davis started the ZDTV channel, a technology-themed television network. 

From 1999 through 2000, as part of an effort to restructure Ziff-Davis Inc, SoftBank would sell ZDTV to Paul Allen's Vulcan Inc. which would later be renamed to TechTV, and spin off ZD and ZDNet. 

Since 2004, Ziff Davis has annually hosted a trade show in New York City known as DigitalLife.  DigitalLife showcases the newest technology in consumer electronics, gaming and entertainment. Unlike E3 (Electronic Entertainment Expo) or the Worldwide Developers Conference, DigitalLife is open to the public.

In November 2006, Ziff Davis announced the cancellation of Official PlayStation Magazine. They cited a lack of interest in the magazine (and its demo disk) due to digital distribution. OPM had begun in 1997.

Ziff Davis Media Inc.
In 2001, the new company Ziff Davis Media Inc., a partnership of Willis Stein & Partners and James Dunning (former Ziff Davis CEO, chairman, and president), made an agreement with CNET Networks Inc. and ZDNet to acquire the URLs of Ziff Davis. Ziff Davis Media Inc. gained thereby the online content licensing rights to 11 publications, including PC Magazine, CIO Insight, and eWEEK, webpage of industry insider Spencer Katt.

In July 2007, Ziff Davis Media announced the sale of its enterprise (B2B or business-to-business) division to Insight Venture Partners. The sale included all B2B publications, which include eWeek, Baseline, and CIOinsight, and all related online properties. The enterprise division is now an independent company named Ziff Davis Enterprise Group (ZDE).

On March 5, 2008, Ziff Davis Media Inc. announced it had filed for Chapter 11 bankruptcy protection in order to restructure its debt and operations. 
 and emerged, after a court supervised corporate restructuring in July 2009. In conjunction with this announcement they also stated that they are discontinuing their print copy of PC Magazine.  According to BtoBonline, Ziff Davis Media made an agreement with an ad hoc group of noteholders, who will provide $24.5 million to fund the company's operations and help plan the restructuring.

Acquisition

In June 2010, Boston private equity firm, Great Hill Partners, purchased Ziff Davis, with online media executive Vivek Shah. At the time, Ziff Davis properties consisted of PCMag.com, ExtremeTech, GearLog, GoodCleanTech, DLtv, AppScout, CrankyGeeks, Smart Device Central and TechSaver.com, and reached over 7 million users a month. Shah, with intentions of revitalizing the business, serial purchased logicbuy.com, geek.com, computershopper.com, toolbox.com, and Focus Research. Focus Research was a major provider of online research to enterprise buyers and high-quality leads to IT vendors. It was later renamed to "Ziff Davis B2B Focus" and operated as a stand-alone unit within Ziff Davis. Niche sites of the Ziff Davis B2B Focus network include ITManagement.com, ITSecurity.com, VOIP-News.com and InsideCRM.com.

On November 16, 2012 Great Hill sold the company to j2Global, a provider of cloud services. The purchase price was $175 million, approximately 2.9 times the estimated 2013 revenue. j2 Global actually paid $167 million in an all-cash deal.

Digital media growth 
On February 4, 2013, Ziff Davis acquired IGN Entertainment from News Corporation. Soon afterward, Ziff Davis announced the discontinuation of the 1UP.com, UGO.com, and GameSpy.com sites in order to "[focus] on our two flagship brands, IGN and AskMen".

In May 2013, Ziff Davis acquired NetShelter, a display advertising network oriented towards consumer electronics and technology publishers, from ImPowered.

In November 2013, Ziff Davis acquired TechBargains.com, a deal aggregation site for consumer electronics.

In June 2014, Ziff Davis acquired eMedia Communications from Reed Business Information. In December 2014, Ziff Davis acquired Ookla, owner of Speedtest.net.

In December 2015, Ziff Davis acquired Offers.com an online source of offers, deals, coupons, coupon codes, promos, free trials, and more.

In December 2017, Ziff Davis acquired Mashable, an American entertainment, culture, tech, science and social good digital media platform, for $50 million. Following its acquisition of Mashable, Ziff Davis announced that it would implement longer, more in-depth content to boost the site's search traffic and restructure the platform to reduce costs. 

In 2018, Ziff Davis had 117 million readers, reaching 115 countries with 60 international editions. Most of Ziff Davis' international editions are partnerships with local publishers, all of whom use a domestic content management system. The common CMS lets oversea editions get content from Ziff Davis' owned-and-operated markets and re-purpose it for their own editions. To establish itself in foreign markets, Ziff Davis asks its local partner to hold events. Popular past events include IGN Convention Bahrain, Abu Dhabi, and Qatar.

In September 2019, Ziff Davis acquired Spiceworks, a professional network for the information technology industry.

In November 2020, Ziff Davis acquired RetailMeNot for $420 million, an aggregator of coupon offers across multiple website properties.

Current properties
 AskMen
 BlackFriday.com
 BestBlackFriday.com
 Downdetector
 Ekahau
 emedia
 eVoice
 ExtremeTech
 Everyday Health
 Geek.com
 HowLongToBeat.com
HR Technologist
 Humble Bundle
 IGN
 IPVanish
 Line2
 Livedrive
 Loseit.com
 Mashable
 MarTech Advisor
 Moz.com
 Offers.com
 PCMag
 RetailMeNot
 Salesify
 SMTP
 Speedtest.net by Ookla
 MapGenie
 Spiceworks
 StrongVPN
 SugarSync
 Techbargains.com
 Toolbox.com
 VIPRE
 Ziff Davis Tech
 Ziff Davis B2B

Sold properties
 DeveloperShed.com
 eSeminars (sold to QuinStreet)
 Electronic Gaming Monthly (sold back to magazine founder Steve Harris)
 FileFront
 GameTab.com
 GameVideos.com
 Linux-Watch (sold to QuinStreet)
 Linuxdevices.com (sold to QuinStreet)
 Microsoft Watch (sold to QuinStreet)
 MyCheats.com
 PDF Zone (sold to QuinStreet)
 Publish (sold to QuinStreet)
 ZDNet (sold to CNET, their biggest rival)

Discontinued properties
 1Up.com
 A+ Magazine
 Computer Gaming World
 Creative Computing
 GameNOW
 Games for Windows: The Official Magazine
 GameSpy (formerly part of IGN Network)
 GameTrailers
 GMR MacUser (US Edition, 1985–1997)
 Microsystems Official U.S. PlayStation Magazine Patch Management
 PCMag – continues online
 PC/Computing (formerly Ziff-Davis Smart Business)
 Small Business Center
 Sm@rt Partner
 UGO Networks
 Vault Network
 Windows Sources Xbox Nation
 Yahoo! Internet Life''

References

Further reading
 Thorsen, Tor, "RIP OPM". GameSpot, CNET Networks, November 20, 2006.
 Ziff Davis File:Press Release, Ziff Davis Reports Fourth Quarter 2005 Results. Ziff Davis Publishing Inc., October 8, 2006.
 Ziff Davis Corporate Timeline January 6, 2009.

External links
 
 Ziff Davis at comics.org
 Ziff Davis at comicbookdb.com

1927 establishments in Illinois
American companies established in 1927
Companies listed on the Nasdaq
Publishing companies established in 1927
Mass media companies established in 1927
Companies that filed for Chapter 11 bankruptcy in 2008
Mass media companies based in New York City
Online mass media companies of the United States
Magazine publishing companies of the United States
Defunct comics and manga publishing companies
History of Chicago
2012 mergers and acquisitions